The JSC Irkut Corporation is a Russian aircraft manufacturer, headquartered in the Aeroport District, Northern Administrative Okrug, Moscow, and is best known as being the manufacturer of the Sukhoi Su-30 family of interceptor/ground-attack aircraft. The company was founded in 1932 in the Transbaykal region of the Soviet Union as the Irkutsk Aviation Plant (IAP). The Russian government merged Irkut with Mikoyan, Ilyushin, Sukhoi, Tupolev, and Yakovlev as a new company named United Aircraft Corporation.

History

Soviet era (1932–1993) 
On 28 March 1932, the Irkutsk Aviation Plant (IAP) was established under order No. 181 by the Main Directorate of the USSR People's Commissariat for Heavy Industry. On 18 August 1934, the form marking the completion of construction manufacturing plant for the new bureau was signed. The first aircraft manufactured by the IAP was the Tupolev I-14, which had its flight on 16 February 1935. The IAP later started mass production of the Tupolev SB Bomber in the spring of 1936. In July 1941, the IAP started delivery of Petlyakov Pe-2 dive bombers. From 1942, the IAP started mass production of two long-range bomber aircraft: Ilyushin Il-4 and Yermolayev Yer-2 until 1945, probably for the Soviet Air Forces for World War II. From 1946, the IAP started production of the Tupolev Tu-2 tactical bomber until 1949. From 1950, the IAP started mass production of two bomber aircraft, the Tupolev Tu-14 and the Ilyushin Il-28 until 1956. In 1957, the IAP renovated itself and started production of the Antonov An-12 military transport aircraft. From 1960, the IAP started mass production of the supersonic bomber and reconnaissance aircraft, the Yakovlev Yak-28 until 1972. From 1967, the IAP started mass production of the Antonov An-24 military transport aircraft until 1971. From 1970, the IAP started mass production of the fighter-bombers, the Mikoyan MiG-23UB and the Mikoyan MiG-27 until 1986. In 1982, IAP specialists started organization of Mikoyan MiG-27 licensed production in India. The Sukhoi Su-27UB, produced by the IAP as a two-seat operational conversion trainer, had its maiden flight on 10 September 1986. The first Sukhoi Su-30 developed by the aviation plant had its first flight on 14 April 1992.

Contemporary era (1993–present) 
On 30 December 1996, a contract was signed between the IAP and the Indian Air Force (IAF) for the delivery of the Sukhoi Su-30MKI to the IAF. The first Beriev Be-200, an amphibious aircraft, developed by the IAP, had its first flight on 24 September 1998. On 27 December 2002, the Irkutsk Aviation Production Association renamed themselves as the Irkut Corporation. The Irkut Corporation became the first Russian defence firm to carry out an initial public offering in March 2004. It traded 23.3% of the corporation's shares in the stock market. In the same year, the Irkut Corporation had integrated the Yakovlev Design Bureau into its corporate structure, making it a subsidiary. In 20 December the Irkut Corporation signed a contract with Airbus to produce components for the Airbus A320 family aircraft. In 2006, the Russian government merged Irkut with Ilyushin, Mikoyan, Sukhoi, Tupolev and Yakovlev as a new company called United Aircraft Corporation.

Irkut has also entered into a joint venture with Indian military aircraft manufacturer HAL to manufacture the UAC/HAL Il-214, which will be designed by Ilyushin. In July 2007, the Irkut Corporation was selected as a head contractor for MC-21 short/mid range airliner program. The MC-21 would be the first aircraft the Irkut Corporation had designed. Production of the aircraft would start in 2014.

Integration of Sukhoi Civil Aircraft into the Irkut Corporation
At the end of November 2018, United Aircraft Corporation transferred  from Sukhoi to the Irkut Corporation, to become UAC's airliner division, as Leonardo S.p.A. pulled out in early 2017 because of Superjet's poor financial performance.
Irkut will manage the Superjet 100, the MC-21 and the Russo-Chinese CR929 widebody, but the Il-114 passenger turboprop and modernized Ilyushin Il-96-400 widebody will stay with Ilyushin.
The new commercial division will also include the Yakovlev Design Bureau, avionics specialist UAC—Integration Center and composite manufacturer AeroComposit.

Organization 
 Irkut Corporation
 Regional Aircraft-Branch of the Irkut Corporation (before:Sukhoi Civil Aircraft)
 Irkutsk Aviation Plant
 JSC Yakovlev Design Bureau
 A. S. Yakovlev Engineering Center
 BETA AIR

Sanctions 
In January 2023 Japan imposed sanctions on Irkut Corporation.

Products

Manufactured products 
These products are designed by a different company while the Irkut Corporation and its branches are responsible for manufacturing them.

Designed products 
These products are designed by the Irkut Corporation and its branches.

Products of Regional Aircraft
Superjet 100

Corporate governance

Presidents 
 Yuri Slyusar (Chairman of the Board of Directors of Irkut Corporation, President of UAC)
 Oleg Demchenko (President of the Irkut Corporation)

Vice presidents 
 Aleksander Veprev (General Director of Irkutsk Aviation Plant, an affiliate of Irkut Corporation, Vice-President of Irkut Corporation)
 Konstantin Popovich (Vice-President of Irkut Corporation for aircraft development, Director of the A.S. Yakovlev Engineering Center, Chief Designer of the МС-21 aircraft)
 Vladimir Sautov (Vice-President of Irkut Corporation for marketing and external relations)
 Kirill Budaev (Chief of civil aircraft marketing and sales service, Vice-President of Irkut Corporation)

References

External links

 Website of Irkut Corporation 
 Website of Irkut Corporation (in English)
 YouTube Channel

Aircraft manufacturers of Russia
Aircraft manufacturers of the Soviet Union
Companies listed on the Moscow Exchange
United Aircraft Corporation